Dease Lake is a community in northern British Columbia.

Dease Lake may also refer to:

 Dease Lake (British Columbia), a lake in northern British Columbia
 Dease Lake (ship, 1934), a boat of the Mackenzie River watershed
 Dease Lake Airport, British Columbia